Alexandre Rocha Santos Padilha is a Brazilian physician and politician affiliated with the Workers Party (PT). He serves as minister of Institutional Relations in under Luiz Inácio Lula da Silva, a position he previously held from 2009 to 2011. He served as minister of health under Dilma Rousseff from 2011 to 2014. He unsuccessfully ran for governor of São Paulo state in the 2014 election. On 1 January 2023, he was once again named Secretary of Institutional Affairs by President Luiz Inácio Lula da Silva, who reinstated the office.

See also
Central Única dos Trabalhadores
World Health Organization

References

|-

|-

|-

1971 births
Living people
Health ministers of Brazil
São Paulo (state) politicians
Members of the Chamber of Deputies (Brazil) from São Paulo
Workers' Party (Brazil) politicians
21st-century Brazilian physicians